Shreveport is a city in the U.S. state of Louisiana. It is the third most populous city in Louisiana after New Orleans and Baton Rouge. The Shreveport–Bossier City metropolitan area, with a population of 393,406 in 2020, is the fourth largest in Louisiana, though 2020 census estimates placed its population at 397,590. The bulk of Shreveport is in Caddo Parish, of which it is the parish seat. It extends along the west bank of the Red River (most notably at Wright Island, the Charles and Marie Hamel Memorial Park, and Bagley Island) into neighboring Bossier Parish. The United States Census Bureau's 2020 census tabulation for the city's population was 187,593, though the American Community Survey's census estimates determined 189,890 residents.

Shreveport was founded in 1836 by the Shreve Town Company, a corporation established to develop a town at the juncture of the newly navigable Red River and the Texas Trail, an overland route into the newly independent Republic of Texas. Prior to Texas becoming independent, this trail entered Mexico. It grew throughout the 20th century and, after the discovery of oil in Louisiana, became a national center for the oil industry. Standard Oil of Louisiana (absorbed by Standard Oil of New Jersey and now part of ExxonMobil) and United Gas Corporation (now part of Pennzoil) were headquartered in the city until the 1960s and 1980s. After the loss of jobs in the oil industry, the close of Shreveport Operations (a General Motors vehicle factory), and other economic problems it struggled with a declining population, poverty, drugs and violent crime. However, the city continues in its efforts to revitalize its infrastructure, revive the economy through diversification, and lower crime. Despite these efforts, the city witnessed the largest number of homicides in its recorded history in 2021, eclipsing the previous record set in 1993.

Shreveport is the educational, commercial and cultural center of the Ark-La-Tex region, where Arkansas, Louisiana, and Texas meet. It is the location of Centenary College of Louisiana, Louisiana State University Shreveport, Louisiana Tech University Shreveport, Southern University at Shreveport, and Louisiana Baptist University. Its neighboring city, Bossier City, is the location of Bossier Parish Community College. It forms part of the I-20 Cyber Corridor linking Shreveport, Bossier City, Ruston, Grambling, and Monroe to Dallas and Tyler, Texas, and Atlanta, Georgia. Companies with significant operations or headquarters in Shreveport are Amazon, Regions Financial Corporation, JPMorgan Chase, Sam's Town Hotel and Gambling Hall, AT&T Mobility, United Parcel Service, Walmart, Chick-fil-A, Waffle House, SWEPCO, General Electric, UOP LLC, Calumet Specialty Products Partners, and APS Payroll.

History

Early settlers
Shreveport was established to create a town at the meeting point of the Brown Bricks and the Texas Trail. The Red River was made navigable by Captain Henry Miller Shreve, who led the United States Army Corps of Engineers efforts to clear the Red River. A  natural log jam, the Great Raft, had previously obstructed passage to shipping. Shreve used a specially modified riverboat, the Heliopolis, to remove the log jam. The company and the village of Shreve Town were named in Shreve's honor.

Shreve Town was originally contained within the boundaries of a piece of land sold to the company in 1835 by the indigenous Caddo Indians. In 1838 Caddo Parish was created from the large Natchitoches Parish, and Shreve Town became its parish seat. On March 20, 1839, the town was incorporated as Shreveport. Originally, the town consisted of 64 city blocks, created by eight streets running west from the Red River and eight streets running south from Cross Bayou, one of its tributaries.

Shreveport soon became a center of steamboat commerce, carrying mostly cotton and agricultural crops from the plantations of Caddo Parish. Shreveport also had a slave market, though slave trading was not as widespread as in other parts of the state. Steamboats plied the Red River, and stevedores loaded and unloaded cargo. By 1860, Shreveport had a population of 2,200 free people and 1,300 slaves within the city limits.

Civil War and Reconstruction
During the American Civil War, Shreveport was the capital of Louisiana from 1863 to 1865, having succeeded Baton Rouge and Opelousas after each fell under Union control. The city was a Confederate stronghold throughout the war and was the site of the headquarters of the Trans-Mississippi Department of the Confederate Army. Fort Albert Sidney Johnston was built on a ridge northwest of the city. Because of limited development in that area, the site is relatively undisturbed in the 21st century.

Isolated from events in the east, the Civil War continued in the Trans-Mississippi theater for several weeks after Robert E. Lee's surrender in April 1865, and the Trans-Mississippi was the last Confederate command to surrender, on May 26, 1865. "The period May 13–21, 1865, was filled with great uncertainly after soldiers learned of the surrenders of Lee and Johnston, the Good Friday assassination of President Abraham Lincoln and the rapid departure of their own generals." In the confusion there was a breakdown of military discipline and rioting by soldiers. They destroyed buildings containing service records, a loss that later made it difficult for many to gain Confederate pensions from state governments.

Throughout the war, women in Shreveport did much to assist the soldiers fighting mostly far to the east. Historian John D. Winters writes of them in The Civil War in Louisiana (1963):

The women of Shreveport and vicinity labored long hours over their sewing machines to provide their men with adequate underclothing and uniforms. After the excitement of Fort Sumter, there was a great rush to get the volunteer companies ready and off to New Orleans ... Forming a Military Aid Society, the ladies of Shreveport requested donations of wool and cotton yarn for knitting socks. Joined by others, the Society collected blankets for the wounded and gave concerts and tableaux to raise funds. Tickets were sold for a diamond ring given by the mercantile house of Hyams and Brothers ...

A Confederate minstrel show gave two performances to raise money for the war effort in Shreveport in December 1862. The Shreveport Ladies Aid Society announced a grand dress ball for April 6, 1863. That same month students at the Mansfield Female College, in Mansfield in De Soto Parish, presented a vocal and instrumental concert to support the war.

The Red River, opened by Shreve in the 1830s, remained navigable throughout the Civil War. But seasonal water levels got so low at one point that Union Admiral David Dixon Porter was trapped with his gunboats north of Alexandria. His engineers quickly constructed a temporary dam to raise the water level and free his fleet.

In 1873, Shreveport lost 759 citizens in an 80-day period to a yellow fever epidemic, with over 400 additional victims eventually succumbing. The total death toll from August through November was approximately 1,200. Five Roman Catholic priests in the city and two religious sisters died while caring for yellow fever victims in the city.

20th century to present
In 1895, Justin Vincent Gras (1868–1959), an immigrant from France, opened the largest grocery and liquor store in Shreveport. "What is good for Shreveport is good for me" became his motto. He had come to the city four years before to work for his uncle, and had quickly learned English and the mercantile business. Gras also invested in real estate; by the 1920s he was the largest landholder in Caddo Parish. Gras and his wife, Eugenie, became philanthropists, donating $2.3 million to establish the Community Foundation of North Louisiana. During World War I, Gras rebuilt the home church of his native village in the Pyrenees. He is interred at St. Joseph Cemetery in Shreveport.

A number of local African American musicians became nationally famous. By the 1910s, Huddie William Ledbetter—also known as "Lead Belly", a blues singer and guitarist—was performing for Shreveport audiences in St. Paul's Bottoms, the notable red-light district of Shreveport that operated legally from 1903 to 1917. Ledbetter began to develop his own style of music after exposure to a variety of musical influences on Fannin Street, a row of saloons, brothels, and dance halls in the Bottoms. Bluesmen Jesse Thomas, Dave Alexander, and Kenny Wayne Shepherd, and the early jazz and ragtime composers Bill Wray and Willian Christopher O'Hare were all from Shreveport. Lead Belly achieved international fame.

By 1914, neglect and lack of use, due to diversion of freight traffic to railroad lines, resulted in the Red River becoming unnavigable. In projects accomplished over decades, in 1994, the United States Army Corps of Engineers restored navigability by completion of a series of federally funded lock-and-dam structures and a navigation channel.

As early as 1924, the citizens of Shreveport became interested in hosting a military flying field. In 1926, Shreveport citizens learned that the 3rd Attack Wing stationed at Fort Crockett, Texas, would be enlarged by 500 percent and would require at least 20,000 acres (81 km2) to support aerial gunnery and a bombing range. The efforts to procure the government's commitment to build the facility in the Greater Shreveport metropolitan area were spearheaded by a committee co-chaired by local civic leaders Andrew Querbes and John D. Ewing, beginning in 1927. It took a great deal of correspondence between the interested parties and the original proposal was rejected. However, in February 1928, a young crop duster, an Air Corps captain named Harold Ross Harris, was hired to fly over the local area in order to find a suitable site for the airfield.

Captain Harris selected what he felt was an adequate location for a military airfield. It was a sprawling section of cotton plantation near Bossier City. The site selection committee, representing the wealthiest taxpayers in the city, unanimously agreed upon the Barksdale Field location. A delegation of citizens traveled to Washington, D.C., to personally present the advantages of the proposed site to the War Department. Following the return of this delegation, a special army board visited Shreveport and reported the location met all requirements of the Air Corps.

The site was selected December 5, 1928, as the location of the airfield. The land in Bossier Parish on which the airfield was built was unincorporated land near Bossier City that was annexed by the city of Shreveport once the site had been selected among 80 candidates. The real estate was purchased from over 800 property owners via a $1,500,000 municipal bond issue approved by Shreveport voters in 1929 in fulfillment of the pledge that the citizens of Shreveport made to the U.S. government. The last of these bonds matured on December 31, 1959. After acquisition, Shreveport then donated the land to the federal government per their agreement, while the federal government assumed all the costs of building construction and equipment installation. Shreveport had originally proposed a site adjacent to Cross Lake, but the United States Department of War deemed this location inappropriate due to the lack of suitable terrain for the facility's future expansion. Subsequent to the establishment of the military installation, Bossier City grew and expanded southward and eastward, eventually enveloping the area surrounding the base. Technically, Barksdale AFB is neither in Bossier City nor Shreveport but, like all military bases, is an autonomous community with its own infrastructure.
 
In September, 1941, the capture of the city of Shreveport was the objective of a U.S. Army war game, or military exercise, known as the Louisiana Maneuvers. The field exercise's mission was accomplished largely due to General George S. Patton, who commanded the mock "Blue" army's 2nd Armored Division.

Shreveport was home to the Louisiana Hayride radio program, broadcast weekly from the Shreveport Municipal Memorial Auditorium. During its heyday from 1948 to 1960, this program stimulated the careers of some of the greatest figures in American music. The Hayride featured musicians including Hank Williams and Elvis Presley, who made his broadcasting debut at this venue. In the mid-1950s, KWKH was the first major radio station to feature the music of Presley on its long-running Louisiana Hayride program at the Shreveport Municipal Auditorium. Horace Logan, long-term KWKH program manager and originator of the Hayride, and Frank Page introduced Presley on the Hayride.

African American veterans of World War II were among activists in Shreveport through the 1960s who worked in the civil rights movement to correct injustices under Jim Crow and disenfranchisement of blacks. While activism gradually increased, 1963 was a particularly violent year in Shreveport because of white resistance. The Shreveport home of Dr. C. O. Simpkins was bombed in retaliation for his work with Dr. Martin Luther King Jr.

In September 1963 George W. D'Artois, Public Service Commissioner, refused a permit for a march to the Little Union Baptist Church in Shreveport, where mourners gathered to honor and commemorate four black girls killed in the 16th Street Baptist Church Bombing on September 15 in Birmingham, Alabama. D'Artois and other officers entered the church on horseback and took out the pastor, Dr. Harry Blake, beating him severely.

Also in 1963, headlines across the country reported that African American musician Sam Cooke was arrested in Shreveport after his band tried to register at a "whites-only" Holiday Inn, where they planned to stay before performing in the city. Public facilities in Louisiana were still segregated. In the months following, Cooke recorded the civil rights era song, "A Change Is Gonna Come". In 1964 Congress passed the Civil Rights Act to end segregation of public facilities.

In the mid-1990s, the coming of riverboat gambling to Shreveport attracted numerous new patrons to the downtown and spurred a revitalization of the adjacent riverfront areas. Many downtown streets were given a facelift through the "Streetscape" project. Traditional brick sidewalks and crosswalks were built, and statues, sculptures, and mosaics were added to create a better pedestrian environment. The O.K. Allen Bridge, commonly known as the Texas Street bridge, was lit with neon lights. Residents predictably had a variety of reactions to these changes. Shreveport was named an All-American City in 1953, 1979, and 1999.

During the September 11, 2001 attacks, President George W. Bush was taken to the nearby Barksdale Air Force Base. He also made a visit to speak in the city on March 11, 2005.

Since the downturn in the oil industry and other economic problems, the city has struggled with a declining population, unemployment, poverty, drugs and violent crime. City data from 2017 showed a dramatic increase in certain violent crimes from the previous year, including a 138 percent increase in homicides, a 21 percent increase in forcible rapes and more than 130 percent increases in both business armed robberies and business burglaries. In 2018 the local government and police authorities reported a crime drop in most categories; it was part of an overall reduction in crime since the late 20th century. As Shreveport continued its economic resurgence, the Adrian Perkins administration saw the coming of Advanced Aero Services, Tomakk Glass Partners, and the revitalization plan of the Shreveport Economic Recovery Task Force after the Cross Bayou redevelopment plan was rejected.

In June 2020, rapper Hurricane Chris was arrested in Shreveport for second-degree murder. Following the George Floyd killing in Minnesota, multiple protests were held in the city.

Geography
Shreveport is located in Northwest Louisiana. It is the center of the Ark-La-Tex region where Arkansas, Louisiana, and Texas meet. It is also part of the I-20 Cyber Corridor linking the tech-centered Dallas–Fort Worth, Shreveport–Bossier, Greater Monroe, and Greater Atlanta metropolitan areas together. The city's proximity to the nearby cities makes it North Louisiana and the Ark-La-Tex's transportation hub.

Shreveport is the parish seat of Caddo Parish. Portions of the city extend into neighboring Bossier Parish, bordering Bossier City. Shreveport sits on a low elevation overlooking the Red River. Pine forests, cotton fields, wetlands, and waterways mark the outskirts of the city.

Cityscape

Shreveport—since the mid-1990s—has been a major gambling center with a modest downtown skyline. The "Streetscape" project, inspired by the coming of riverboat gaming, gave Shreveport's downtown traditional brick sidewalks, statues, sculptures, and mosaics. The O.K. Allen Bridge (Texas Street bridge) was lit with neon lights. Since then, Downtown Shreveport has seen minor changes until the 2010s; the whole of Shreveport has been improving roads since the mid-2010s, with continued road projects in 2018. In 2018, buildings in Shreveport's downtown and nearby districts were revitalized due to re-investment in the area. In 2020, plans were unveiled for the I-49 Connector and further redevelopment of the city.

Neighborhoods 
Shreveport encompasses many areas, neighborhoods, and districts. The busiest thoroughfares and areas of Shreveport are the Youree Drive area (named for Peter Youree), the Shreveport Downtown Riverfront, and Highland neighborhood. All of the busiest areas are located in Eastern Shreveport, nearby or along the Red River. Below is a list of areas in the Shreveport area of Caddo Parish:

 Acadiana Place
 Allendale
 Allendale-Lakeside, interloop of neighborhoods
 Anderson Island
 Azalea Gardens
 Braemar Estates
 Broadmoor
 Broadmoor Terrace
 Brunswick Place
 Caddo Heights
 Cedar Grove
 Chapel Creek
 Cherokee Park
 Cooper Road
 Crescent Wood
 Cross Lake, some not in city
 Dixie Gardens
 Eden Gardens
 Ellerbe Road Estates
 Ellerbe Woods
 Evangeline Oaks
 Fairfield Heights
 Forbing
 Fox Crossing
 Garden Valley
 Glen Iris
 Greenbrook
 The Haven
 Hidden Trace
 Highland
 Hollywood
 Hollywood Heights
 Huntington
 Ingleside
 Jackson Square
 Jewella-South Park
 Hyde Park
 Lakeside
 Lakeside Acres
 Lakeside on Long Lake
 Ledbetter Heights or The Bottoms
 Long Lake Estates
 Lynbrook
 Madison Park
 Mooretown
 Norris Ferry Crossing
 Norris Ferry Estates
 Norris Ferry Landing
 North Highlands
 Parkside
 Pines Road
 Pierremont
 Pierremont Place
 Pierremont Ridge
 Provenance
 Queensborough
 St. Charles Place
 Shreve Island
 Shreve Lake Estates
 South Broadmoor
 South Highlands
 Southern Hills
 Southern Trace
 Spring Lake
 Stoner Hill
 Sunset Acres
 Towne South
 Twelve Oaks
 Shadow Pines Estates
 Steeple Chase
 Stoner Hill
 University Terrace
 Waterside
 West End
 Western Hills
 Wright Island
 Yarborough

In the Highland section, along Fairfield Avenue, more than a half dozen houses have been designated as historic and listed on the National Register of Historic Places. These include residences once occupied by Lieutenant Governor Thomas Charles Barret, who served early in the 20th century; a Broadway director, Joshua Logan; a former governor, Ruffin Pleasant, and wife; a physician and developer, George W. Robinson; a Coca-Cola bottler, Zehntner Biedenharn; Ewald Max Hoyer, the first mayor of Bossier City beginning in 1907; and John B. Slattery, a major real estate owner, whose former home is one of five remaining structures in Shreveport designed by the noted architect N. S. Allen.

Climate 
Shreveport has a humid subtropical climate (Köppen climate classification Cfa). Severe thunderstorms with heavy rain, hail, damaging winds and tornadoes occur in the area during the spring and summer months. The winter months are normally mild, with an average of 35 days of freezing or below-freezing temperatures per year, with ice and sleet storms possible.

Summer months are hot and humid, with maximum temperatures exceeding  on an average of 91 days per year, with high to very high relative average humidity. Shreveport is home to a branch of the National Weather Service which provides forecasts and warnings for the greater Ark-La-Tex region.

Demographics

Shreveport's population was initially 1,728 at the 1850 U.S. census, and has experienced growth to a historic high of 206,989 at the 1980 census. According to the 2020 United States census, there were 187,593 people, 73,114 households, and 42,775 families residing in the city; the 2020 American Community Survey determined an estimated 189,890 people resided in the city, purporting a slight population rebound. The 2020 census estimates showed Shreveport had 75,680 households with an average of 2.4 people per household. Of the households, 39% were married-couple households, though 44% of its male population and 40% of its female population have never married.

Throughout the city, there were 89,523 housing units, with a 85% occupancy rate; among them, 54% were owner-occupied. Among its units, 73% were single-unit detached homes and 31% of its population moved into those homes from 2015 to 2016. The median value of its owner-occupied housing units were $151,700, and 30% of its units were estimated to be under $100,000; 38% of its units were estimated to cost from $100,000 to $200,000. From 2014 to 2018, the median value of an owner-occupied housing unit was $144,800. The median monthly cost with a mortgage was $1,178 and the median monthly cost without a mortgage was $364; the city of Shreveport had a median gross rent of $810. 

The median income from 2014 to 2018 was $36,338, and the mean income was $55,582. The per capita income was $25,022. By the 2020 American Community Survey, its median household income increased to $40,809. The median income for families grew to $54,023 with a mean income of $82,854; married-couple families $84,282 with a mean of $112,363; and non-family households $26,628 with a mean of $41,090. According to census estimates, 25% of its population earned from $50,000 to $100,000 annually; 13% $100,000 to $200,000; and 5% over $200,000. Approximately 24.9% of Shreveport lived at or below the poverty line, down from 2014 to 2018's census estimates of 25.4%.

Race and ethnicity 

In 2019, the racial and ethnic makeup of Shreveport was 56.9% Black and African American, 36.8% non-Hispanic white, 0.4% American Indian and Alaska Native, 1.7% Asian, 0.1% Native Hawaiian and other Pacific Islander, 0.1% some other race, 1.5% two or more races, and 2.6% Hispanic and Latino American of any race. At the 2010 U.S. census, the racial and ethnic composition of the population was 54.70% Black or African American, 41.16% White, 1.0% Native American, 2.0% Asian, 1.2% from some other race and 1.5% from two or more races. In 2010, about 6.5% of the population was Hispanic or Latino American of any race.

Reflecting the decline in North Louisiana's population, the city of Shreveport's racial and ethnic makeup among Hispanic and Latino Americans declined from 2010 yet rebounded from 2019's census estimates. At the 2020 census, Shreveport remained a predominantly Black and African American city, with 57.77% of the population identifying as such; non-Hispanic whites slightly declined to 35.26% and multiracial or Americans of another race increased to 3.45% of the population. Data from the 2020 United States census reflected growing trends of Hispanic and Latino, and Asian American population growth nationwide.

Religion 
Christianity is the city and metropolitan area's dominant religion, being part of the Bible Belt. Its residents were predominantly Protestant through the nineteenth century. Today, Baptists form the majority of Christians in Shreveport, followed by Methodists and Catholics. Many Baptist and Methodist churches are affiliated with Evangelical Protestant denominations, though several are also affiliated with Mainline Protestantism; among Baptists, the Southern Baptist Convention, National Baptist Convention (USA), National Baptist Convention of America, and Full Gospel Baptist Church Fellowship are the largest Protestant Baptist denominations in the city. The Progressive National Baptist Convention is the largest Progressive Baptist group in the area. Methodists are mainly affiliates of the African Methodist Episcopal Church or Christian Methodist Episcopal Church, though some also claimed affiliation to the mainline United Methodist Church. The Catholic community is primarily served by the Roman Catholic Diocese of Shreveport.

A large First Baptist Church was once pastored by Monroe E. Dodd, an early radio minister and founder of the former Dodd College for Girls. Former Governor Jimmie Davis, also a Shreveport city commissioner, taught history for a year under Dodd's tutelage. Other historic large Baptist congregations include Galilee Missionary Baptist, Calvary Baptist, Broadmoor Baptist, Summer Grove Baptist, and Mount Canaan Missionary Baptist Church. Summer Grove Baptist Church was previously pastored by Wayne L. DuBose, a Baptist denominational officer. Mount Canaan was previously pastored by Civil Rights icon Dr. Harry Blake, and Galilee was likewise pastored by Dr. E. Edward Jones, another Civil Rights icon.

At the head of Texas Street is the large First United Methodist Church, established at that site in 1884. The current sanctuary dates to 1913. Among its former pastors were D. L. Dykes Jr. and John E. Fellers. During a severe thunderstorm in 2009, the fiberglass steeple of the church toppled and fell onto a passing car. It has since been replaced.

A second Methodist congregation is named for J. S. Noel Jr. The church was begun as a mission in 1906. Methodist layman James Noel and his wife, Fannie, provided financially for the church in its early years. The congregation decided to name the church for the Noel's late son. Like First United Methodist, it opened in the current sanctuary in 1913 and grew rapidly. A fire gutted the building in 1925, and only a portion of the loss was covered by insurance. The members expanded their ranks and rebuilt at the 500 Herndon location.The large Holy Trinity Catholic Church, located downtown, was founded in 1858; it served Irish and German immigrants as well as native-born residents. Five priests died of yellow fever in the 1873 epidemic. The current sanctuary in Romanesque revival style architecture dates to 1896. Particularly striking in size and architecture is St. Mark's Cathedral, an Episcopal Church congregation at 908 Rutherford Street in the Highland area of Shreveport. St. Mark's dates its establishment to the first religious service held in Shreveport in 1839. It became the see of the Episcopal Diocese of Western Louisiana in 1990.

Shreveport is home to Shreveport Community Church, an Evangelical church affiliated with Assemblies of God. The church owns and operates Evangel Christian Academy, a pre‑K through 12th grade private school that has produced an average of 1 million dollars of scholastic scholarships for its graduating seniors every year. The church has produced a biblical musical, Songs of the Season, during the Christmas holidays for over 20 years. Westview Christian Church is an independent Christian church that serves members from diverse denominational backgrounds.

The Eastern Orthodox Church has maintained a presence in Shreveport since the early 1900s. The oldest Orthodox church in the city is St. George Greek Orthodox Church of the Greek Orthodox Archdiocese of America, followed by St. Nicholas Orthodox Church (Antiochian Orthodox Christian Archdiocese of North America), and the Holy Nativity of the Lord Church of the Orthodox Church in America.

The Jewish community of Shreveport dates to the organization of Congregation Har El in 1859, made up primarily of German Jewish immigrants in its early years. It developed as B'nai Zion Temple, today the city's Reform congregation, which built the city's largest synagogue. Agudath Achim, founded in 1905 as an Orthodox congregation of immigrants from Eastern Europe, is today a traditional Jewish synagogue. Shreveport, historically, has had a large and civic-minded Jewish community and has elected three Jewish mayors.

The Islamic community in Shreveport-Bossier constituted approximately 14% of Louisiana's total Muslim population in 2018. The majority of Shreveporter Muslims are Sunni, followed by the Nation of Islam and non-denominational Islam.

Economy

Shreveport was once a major player in United States oil business, and at one time could boast Standard Oil of Louisiana as a locally based company. The Louisiana branch was later absorbed by Standard Oil of New Jersey. Beginning in 1930, United Gas Corporation, the nation's busiest pipeline operator and massive integrated oil company, was headquartered in Shreveport. Pennzoil performed a hostile takeover in 1968, and forced a merger. In the 1980s, the oil and gas industry suffered a large economic downturn. This affected all of the regional economy, and many companies cut back jobs or went out of business, including a large retail shopping mall (South Park Mall) which closed in the late 1990s. Its major facilities were adapted for use by Summer Grove Baptist Church. Shreveport suffered severely from this recession, and many residents left the area.

Since that time, Shreveport has largely transitioned to a service economy. In particular, there has been rapid growth in the gaming industry. The city hosts various riverboat gambling casinos, and, before Hurricane Katrina in 2005, was second only to New Orleans in Louisiana tourism. Nearby Bossier City is home to one of the three horse racetracks in the state, Louisiana Downs. Casinos in Shreveport-Bossier include Sam's Town, Bally's, Horseshoe, Boomtown, and Margaritaville. Diamond Jacks Casino (formerly Isle of Capri) closed in 2020. The Shreveport-Bossier Convention and Tourist Bureau is the official tourism information agency for the region. The bureau maintains a comprehensive database of restaurants, accommodations, attractions, and events.

In May 2005, the Louisiana Boardwalk, a  shopping and entertainment complex, opened in Bossier City across from Shreveport's downtown. It features outlet shopping, several restaurants, a 14‑screen movie theater, a bowling complex, and Bass Pro Shops.

A  convention center was completed in the Shreveport Downtown Riverfront. Managed by SMG, it includes an 800-space parking garage. An adjoining Hilton Hotel opened in June 2007. It was constructed by and owned by the city, which has been a controversial issue, and the subject of discussions about use of public funds.

Shreveport is a major medical center of the region and state. The Louisiana State University Health Sciences Center Shreveport operates at expanded facilities once used by the former Confederate Memorial Medical Center. Major hospitals include Christus Highland Medical Center, Willis Knighton, and the Shriners Hospital for Children.

As of November 2008, excitement had centered around development of the Haynesville Shale, with many new jobs in the natural gas industry expected to be created over the next few years. Residents in the region have been given large bonuses for signing mineral rights leases up to $25,000 per acre. However, economic downturn had resulted in a lower market price for natural gas and slower-than-expected drilling activity. The city expected to generate revenue by leasing the mineral rights on public lands in the near future as neighboring municipalities had already done.

Shreveport was home to Shreveport Operations, a General Motors plant that closed in August 2012. The plant produced the Chevrolet Colorado, GMC Canyon, Hummer H3 series, and the Isuzu i-Series. In January 2013, the plant was leased from Caddo Parish by Elio Motors. In addition to GM, other notable large companies that have had or still have Shreveport manufacturing/assembly or production facilities or operations include: General Electric (electric transformer production), Western Electric (payphone manufacturing, approximately 7,500 employees at its peak, changed ownership through the years but closed in 2001) Honeywell UOP, Libbey-Owens-Ford, Beaird-Poulan (the originator of and, for decades, the only manufacturer of the single-operator chainsaw in the world), Calumet Specialty Products Partners (originally United Gas Corporation's Atlas Processing Unit and then Pennzoil), and Frymaster, LLC (a subsidiary of The Manitowoc Company). In 2017, manufacturing and other goods-producing (e.g. petrochemical refining) jobs accounted for about 5% of Shreveport occupations, compared to 8% for the nationwide percentage of the workforce involved in manufacturing.

Outside of the manufacturing, gambling and hotel industries in Shreveport, JPMorgan Chase, Capital One, and Regions Financial Corporation have regional offices in Shreveport's downtown and surrounding districts and neighborhoods. Dallas–Fort Worth and Metro Atlanta-based AT&T, and New York-based Verizon Communications are also prevalent in the city. AT&T's regional headquarters is located in Downtown Shreveport. Walmart, Lamar Advertising Company, Target and Best Buy, and United Parcel Service also have facilities throughout Shreveport. Amazon and Governor Edwards announced plans to open a fulfillment center in 2021. Amazon began construction on the $200 million fulfillment center in 2021 with completion expected by the end of 2022.The fulfillment center has been expected to create 1,000 direct jobs. Additionally, other business investments alongside Amazon during the early 2020s contributed more than $750 million to revitalizing and expanding the municipal and metropolitan economy.

In 2014, the city government pumped $16.5 million into Mall St. Vincent. In 2015 Fortune magazine ranked Shreveport the "#1 place to start a business". In 2017, Gymboree and Grimaldi's Pizzeria closed their Mall St. Vincent operations; Sears is now closed as well as of 2018. In 2020, Advanced Aero Services planned to open a facility at Shreveport Regional Airport. On July 31, 2020 the Shreveport Economic Recovery Task Force released a revitalization plan with a primary focus on the downtown area.

Film industry
Tax incentives offered by the state government have given Louisiana the third largest film industry in the country, behind California and New York. Louisiana is sometimes called "Hollywood South". A number of films have been made in Shreveport. Facilities include sound stages, prop rental facilities, the Fairgrounds Complex, and the Louisiana Wave Studio, a computer-controlled outdoor wave pool.

Selected films shot in Shreveport include:

 The Guardian (2006): Ashton Kutcher and Kevin Costner
 Factory Girl  (2006): Sienna Miller and Guy Pearce
 The Great Debaters (2007): Denzel Washington
 Mr. Brooks  (2007): Kevin Costner, William Hurt, and Demi Moore
 Premonition  (2007): Sandra Bullock and Julian McMahon
 Cleaner  (2007): Samuel L. Jackson
 The Mist  (2007): Thomas Jane, Toby Jones and Marcia Gay Harden
 Welcome Home Roscoe Jenkins (2008): Martin Lawrence and Cedric The Entertainer
 Soul Men (2008) Samuel L. Jackson, Bernie Mac
 Year One (2008): Jack Black and Michael Cera
 W. (2008): Josh Brolin, Richard Dreyfuss and James Cromwell
 Harold & Kumar Escape from Guantanamo Bay  (2008): John Cho and Kal Penn
 I Hope They Serve Beer in Hell (2009): Matt Czuchry, Jesse Bradford and Geoff Stults
 Super (2010): Elliot Page, Rainn Wilson
 Straw Dogs (2011): James Marsden, Kate Bosworth
 Drive Angry (2011): Nicolas Cage
 Trespass (2011): Nicolas Cage and Nicole Kidman
 Battle: Los Angeles (2011): Michelle Rodriguez, Bridget Moynahan
 The Iceman (2012): Michael Shannon, Winona Ryder
 Ain't Them Bodies Saints  (2013): Casey Affleck, Rooney Mara
 Olympus Has Fallen  (2013): Gerard Butler, Aaron Eckhart, Morgan Freeman
 Texas Chainsaw 3D (2013)
 The Town that Dreaded Sundown (2014)
 Dark Places (2015): Chloë Grace Moretz, Charlize Theron
 I Saw the Light (2015): Tom Hiddleston, Elizabeth Olsen

Several television series have been shot in Shreveport and the surrounding area, including The Gates (2010), and Salem (2014). The Louisiana Film Prize has spurred the creation of over 200 short films shot in Shreveport and Northwest Louisiana by filmmakers from around the world since its inception in 2012.

Arts and culture
Shreveport is home to many theatres, museums, and performing arts groups, including:

 Academy of Children's Theatre
 Artspace Shreveport
 Barnwell Memorial Garden and Art Center
 Hayride Diner/Soundstage 516
 J.O.S.H. Lounge – Jazz, Old School and Heritage  
 Louisiana Dance Theatre
 Louisiana State Exhibit Museum
 Marjorie Lyons Playhouse on the Centenary College Campus
 Meadows Museum of Art – Centenary College
 Multicultural Center of the South
 Once in a Millennium Moon mural by Meg Saligman
 Power and Grace School of Performing Arts
 R. W. Norton Art Gallery
 River City Repertory Theatre, the professional theatre for Shreveport-Bossier
 RiverView Theatre
 Robinson Film Center
 Shreveport House Concerts
 Shreveport Little Theatre
 Shreveport Metropolitan Ballet
 Shreveport Municipal Auditorium
 Shreveport Opera
 Shreveport Symphony Orchestra
 Southern University Museum of Art
 Spring Street Museum
 StageCenter Performing Arts
 The Strand Theatre
 Theatre of the Performing Arts of Shreveport

Events 

 ArtBreak Festival, largest annual student arts festival in the South since 1984
 Barksdale Air Force Base Air Show, held annually since 1933
 Cinco De Mayo Fiesta, held annually since 1998
 Highland Jazz & Blues Festival, held annually the second Saturday of November since 2003
 Holiday in Dixie, annual springtime festival, began 1949
 Independence Bowl, held annually close to New Year's since 1976
 Independence Day Festival, held annually on the 4th of July since 2009
 Let the Good Times Roll Festival, annual Juneteenth festival since 1986
 Louisiana Film Prize, short film competition and film festival
 Mardi Gras parades
 Mudbug Madness, annual celebration of crawfish, held each May since 1984
 Red River Balloon Rally, annual summer festival since 2016
 Red River Revel, annual autumn arts festival which began in 1976; the largest outdoor festival in northern Louisiana
 The State Fair of Louisiana, held annually each autumn since 1906

Mardi Gras
Mardi Gras celebrations in Shreveport date to the mid‑19th century when krewes and parades were organized along the lines of those of New Orleans. Mardi Gras in Shreveport did not survive the cancellations caused by World War I. Attempts to revive it in the 1920s were unsuccessful, and the last Carnival celebrations in Shreveport for decades were held in 1927. Mardi Gras in Shreveport was revived beginning in 1984 with the organization of the Krewe of Apollo. The Krewes of Gemini, Centaur, Aesclepius, Highland, Sobek, Harambee, and others, followed during the next decade and a half. The first krewe to revive parading was Gemini in 1989. Today, Mardi Gras is again an important part of the cultural life of the Shreveport-Bossier metropolitan area.

Sports

Dating back to 1911, the state fairgrounds (and later Independence Stadium, formerly State Fair Stadium) has traditionally hosted a college football game or two during the State Fair of Louisiana, an event currently dubbed the Red River State Fair Classic. Since 1976, Independence Stadium has served as host of college football's annual Independence Bowl. Also, the Louisiana Tech Bulldogs football team occasionally hosts games at Independence Stadium. Shreveport was also home to a few now defunct football teams. The Houston franchise of the professional World Football League relocated to Shreveport rebranded as the Shreveport Steamer midway through the 1974 season, but the franchise along with the WFL folded midway through the 1975 season.

Another franchise named the Shreveport Steamers played as a member of the American Football Association from 1979 until folding in 1981. Shreveport's Independence Stadium was also home to the Shreveport Pirates, an unsuccessful professional Canadian Football League franchise that opened play in 1994 but folded after the 1995 season.Baseball in Shreveport has an extensive past. The city had affiliated Minor League Baseball teams from 1968 to 2002. The most memorable team was the Shreveport Captains of the Texas League. Baseball teams in Shreveport have gone through eight different name changes and seven different leagues all since 1895. Shreveport's most recent independent minor league baseball team, the Shreveport-Bossier Captains, ceased operations in 2011 and moved to Laredo, Texas.

The city also has an extensive history in basketball and soccer. The Shreveport Crawdads and Shreveport Storm operated in 1994 and 1995 as members of the Continental Basketball Association. The Shreveport-Bossier Mavericks of the American Basketball Association played from 2013 to 2015 before relocating to Owensboro, Kentucky; since 2021, the Mavericks returned as the Shreveport Mavericks within The Basketball League. The Shreveport/Bossier Lions played in 1998 as affiliates of the United Soccer League. NPSL-affiliate Shreveport Rafters FC operated from 2016 to 2018; their expansion team for the Women's Premier Soccer League operated for one season in 2017. Shreveport almost had a USL expansion team in 2020 before its rejection by the city council, though USL League Two announced the establishment of Blue Goose SC in 2022.

The city was once considered as location for an NBA G League-affiliate of the New Orleans Pelicans. The city council unanimously rejected the proposal. The Shreveport Mudbugs are a Tier II junior ice hockey team that has competed in the North American Hockey League since 2016. The Centenary Gentlemen and Ladies compete in NCAA Division III as a member of the Southern Collegiate Athletic Conference. The LSU–Shreveport Pilots compete in the NAIA as a member of the Red River Athletic Conference.

Government

Founded in 1836 and incorporated in 1839, Shreveport is the parish seat of Caddo Parish. It is part of the First Judicial District, housing the parish courthouse. It also houses the Louisiana Second Circuit Court of Appeal, which consists of nine elected judges representing twenty parishes in Northwest Louisiana. A portion of east Shreveport extends into Bossier Parish due to the changing course of the Red River.

The city of Shreveport has a mayor-council government. The elected municipal officials include the mayor, Adrian Perkins, and seven members of the city council. Cedric Glover, a member of the Louisiana House of Representatives, was the first African American to hold the mayoral position. Under the mayor-council government, the mayor serves as the executive officer of the city. As the city's chief administrator and official representative, the mayor is responsible for the general management of the city and for seeing that all laws and ordinances are enforced.

Crime 
According to the most recent FBI statistics, the total crime rate in Shreveport is 5,722.4 per 100,000 people, or 143.92% higher than the national rate of 2,346.0 per 100,000 people and 62.39% higher than the Louisiana total crime rate of 3,523.8 per 100,000 people.  The violent crime rate in Shreveport is 923.0 per 100,000 people, or 138.01% higher than the national rate of 387.8 per 100,000 people, and 44.35% higher than the Louisiana violent crime rate of 639.4 per 100,000 people.

Shreveport has one of the highest crime rates in America compared to all communities of all sizes—from the smallest towns to the very largest cities. One's chance of becoming a victim of either violent or property crime is 1 in 15. Within Louisiana, more than 93% of the communities had a lower crime rate than Shreveport. NeighborhoodScout found Shreveport to be one of the top 100 most dangerous cities in the United States. In the late 1980s, authorities started to track local Los Angeles-based gangs that distributed cocaine out of low-income neighborhoods. The first and the biggest street gang was the 52nd Street Hoover Crips; shortly after LA gangs moved in, gang-related homicides began to rise. Shreveport was the first city in Louisiana to have Crips and Blood gangs. In 1993, Shreveport hit a peak in murders, with 86 killings. Most of the killings were drug- or gang-related homicides. In 2017, Shreveport was placed 18th on 24/7 Wall St. list of "America's 25 Murder Capitals." Shreveport's crime rate was 71% higher than the Louisiana average. The crime rate was also 149% higher than the national average.

The city had a so-called "saggy pants" law since 2007. The city ordinance was repealed by the city council in June 2019.

Education

Caddo Public Schools is a school district based in Shreveport. The district serves all of Caddo Parish. Its founding superintendent was Clifton Ellis Byrd, a Virginia native, who assumed the chief administrative position in 1907 and continued until his death in 1926. C. E. Byrd High School, which was established in 1925 on Line Avenue at the intersection with East Kings Highway, bears his name. There are a number of private schools in the city as well, including Loyola College Prep, a coeducational high school founded in 1902 as the all-male St. John's High School.

Colleges and universities 

Shreveport has several colleges, including the Methodist-affiliated Centenary College (founded at Jackson, Louisiana, in 1825; relocated to Shreveport in 1908) and Louisiana State University in Shreveport, which opened as a two-year institution in 1967; it became a four-year institution in 1976. Louisiana State University Health Sciences Center Shreveport, the only medical school in Northern Louisiana, opened in 1969. Shreveport also has one of the largest nursing schools in northern Louisiana, the Northwestern State University College of Nursing.

Louisiana Tech University at Shreveport-Bossier City was launched in 2012 offering their Executive MBA and main campus undergraduate and graduate degree programs at the university's Shreveport Center. Southern University at Shreveport (SUSLA) offers a two-year associate's degree program. Founded in 1973, Louisiana Baptist University and Theological Seminary is also located in Shreveport, at 6301 Westport Avenue.

Ayers Career College is a Shreveport-based college that offers career training in the medical and HVAC fields. Since July 2007, Shreveport is home to a local Remington College campus. This location offers both diploma and degree programs, and is active in the Shreveport community. Virginia College opened in 2012. Located in Shreveport-Bossier City, it offers career training in areas such as business and office, health and medical, and medical billing.

Media
Shreveport and its surrounding area are served by a variety of local newspapers, magazines, television stations and radio stations. The major daily newspaper serving the area is The Shreveport Times, owned by USA Today parent Gannett. Its headquarters is in Shreveport's downtown near Interstate 20. The newspaper's former rival, the afternoon Shreveport Journal, ceased publication in 1991. Other major newspapers include The Shreveport Sun, Caddo Citizen, and SB Magazine. The Shreveport Sun is the area's primary African American newspaper.

Across the Red River, Shreveport's sister city of Bossier City is served by the daily Bossier Press-Tribune. The Barksdale Warrior is the weekly newspaper of record for the Barksdale Air Force Base. Alternative publications include The Forum Newsweekly, City Lights, The Inquisitor and The Shreveport Catalyst. Twice annually, North Louisiana History, the journal of the North Louisiana Historical Association, is published in Shreveport.

Shreveport and Bossier City are primarily served by two major cable television and internet companies: Shreveport is served by Comcast and Bossier City is served by Suddenlink.

Shreveport is home to several radio stations, particularly KWKH and KEEL, which have reputations beyond the city. The three commercial television outlets are KSLA (CBS), founded in 1954; KTBS-TV (ABC), founded in 1955; and KTAL-TV, which arrived in Shreveport in September 1961 as the NBC station. KTBS was an NBC station, with occasional ABC programs, from 1955 to 1961, when it switched affiliation to ABC. KTAL, formerly known as KCMC of Texarkana, was a CBS outlet prior to conversion to NBC, when it began to cover Shreveport as well as Texarkana. Don Owen (1930–2012), a member of the Louisiana Public Service Commission from 1984 to 2002, is also a former news anchorman on KSLA. The Shreveport-Bossier City metropolitan area is also the point of origination of internet radio station KHAM Radio which signed on in March 2011. The internet radio station is completely web-based and is not affiliated with any terrestrial radio station in the area.

Infrastructure

Transportation

Highways and roads

Shreveport's past reflects the need for mass transit and public roads. As far back as the 1870s, residents used mule-drawn street cars that were converted to electric motorized cars by 1890. Commuter rail systems in Shreveport flourished for many decades, and rail car lines extended out to rural areas. In 1930 trolleys and rail cars began to be replaced by buses, although motor buses did not finally replace all trolley service until the 1960s. In the 1960s, the Interstate Highway System came to the area with the construction of Interstate 20.

The local public transportation provider, SporTran, provides moderately extensive bus service throughout Shreveport and Bossier City. Sportran operates seven days a week on seventeen bus routes (five night routes) from 6:00 a.m. to 1:00 am, with no night service on Sunday. The highway system has a cross-hair and loop freeway structure similar to that of Texas cities like Houston and Dallas. The loop consists of the Outer Loop Freeway Interstate 220 on the north and the Inner Loop Freeway, Louisiana Highway 3132, on the south, forming approximately an  semi-loop around downtown. Another loop is formed by the Bert Kouns Industrial Loop (Louisiana Highway 526) and circles further south, bisecting Interstate 49. I-49 now extends north to Interstate 30 in Arkansas, though there is a gap in I-49 within Shreveport.

Shreveport lies along the route of the proposed Interstate 69 North American Free Trade Agreement (NAFTA) superhighway that will link Canada, the U.S. industrial Midwest, Texas, and Mexico.

Airports
Shreveport is served by two airports. The larger is Shreveport Regional Airport (SHV), established in 1952, and is served by Allegiant Air (to Las Vegas, Los Angeles, Daytona Beach (starting June 2, 2022), Destin/Fort Walton Beach (starting May 27, 2022) and Orlando), American Airlines (to Dallas/Ft. Worth and Charlotte), Delta Air Lines (to Atlanta), and United Airlines (as United Express) (to Houston and Denver). The smaller airport, Shreveport Downtown Airport (DTN), was built in 1931 and is located north of the Downtown Business District along the Red River. It is currently a general aviation and reliever airport, but was originally Shreveport's commercial airport.

Railroads
The Shreveport Waterworks Museum contains the Shreveport Railroad Museum, commemorating area railroad history.

The city had been served until the 1960s by several passenger railroads, at different stations.

Central Station at 1025 Marshall Street served the Louisiana and Arkansas Railroad
Texas & Pacific Station at 104 Market Street served the Texas and Pacific Railway. Its last trains were unnamed successors to the Louisiana Eagle (Fort Worth-New Orleans) and the Louisiana Daylight. (El Paso-New Orleans)
Union Station on Louisiana Avenue at Lake Street had the Illinois Central (the Southwestern Limited / Northeastern Limited -Shreveport-Meridian, MS), Kansas City Southern Railway (the Southern Belle -Kansas City-New Orleans), St. Louis Southwestern Railway (the Lone Star -Dallas-Memphis) and the Southern Pacific.

Military installations

Barksdale Air Force Base is located in Bossier Parish across the river from Shreveport, which annexed and donated the land for its construction in the 1920s. Named for pioneer army aviator Lt. Eugene Hoy Barksdale and originally called Barksdale Army Air Field, it opened in 1933 and became Barksdale Air Force Base in 1947. Headquartered here are the Air Force Global Strike Command, 8th Air Force, 2d Bomb Wing, and 307th Wing. The primary aircraft housed here is the Boeing B-52 Stratofortress. In earlier years, the base was the home to other famous aircraft, including the B-47 Stratojet.

Shreveport is home to the two 108th Cavalry Squadrons, the reconnaissance element of the 256th Infantry Brigade. Three of the squadron's four cavalry troops are located at 400 East Stoner Avenue in a historic armory known as "Fort Humbug". It got the name due to the Confederate Army burning logs to look like cannons and placing them along the Red River. This caused Union ironclad ships sailing north on the Red River to be tricked into turning back south.

Notable people

See also

 Houston E. & W. T. Ry. Co. v. United States, a landmark U.S. Supreme Court commerce clause ruling commonly known as "The Shreveport Rate Cases"
Mighty Haag Circus
List of U.S. cities with large Black populations

References

External links 

 City of Shreveport official website
 National Weather Service Shreveport office
 Shreveport-Bossier Convention & Tourist Bureau
 Shreveport/Bossier webpage
 The Times newspaper
 www.Shreveport.com
 Past train stations of Shreveport

 
Louisiana
Cities in Louisiana
Cities in the Ark-La-Tex
Cities in Shreveport – Bossier City metropolitan area
Parish seats in Louisiana
Cities in Bossier Parish, Louisiana
Cities in Caddo Parish, Louisiana
Louisiana African American Heritage Trail
Populated places established in 1836
1836 establishments in Louisiana
Cities in North Louisiana